John Watson Lungstrum (born November 2, 1945) is a senior United States district judge of the United States District Court for the District of Kansas.

Education and career

Born in Topeka, Kansas, Lungstrum grew up in Kansas City, Missouri, where he graduated from the Pembroke Country-Day School in 1963. He received a Bachelor of Arts degree from Yale University in 1967 where he was a prominent leader of the Yale Political Union. He received a Juris Doctor from the University of Kansas School of Law in 1970. He practiced law in Los Angeles, California from 1970 to 1971, after which he served as a lieutenant in the United States Army from 1971 to 1972. He reentered private practice in Lawrence, Kansas from 1972 to 1991, during which time he was a lecturer at the University of Kansas School of Law.

Federal judicial service

On July 24, 1991, President George H. W. Bush nominated Lungstrum to be a United States District Judge of the United States District Court for the District of Kansas, to fill the seat vacated by Judge Dale E. Saffels. The United States Senate confirmed Lungstrum's nomination on October 31, 1991, and he received his commission on November 5, 1991. Between 2001 and 2007, he served as the District of Kansas's Chief Judge. Lungstrum assumed senior status on November 2, 2010.

References

Sources

1945 births
Living people
Judges of the United States District Court for the District of Kansas
Lawyers from Kansas City, Missouri
Lawyers from Los Angeles
United States district court judges appointed by George H. W. Bush
20th-century American judges
United States Army officers
University of Kansas School of Law alumni
Yale University alumni
University of Kansas faculty
21st-century American judges